The Chinese Grand Prix is a round of the Formula One World Championship and was contracted to return in 2023 but will now not do so until 2024 at the earliest. It is currently held at the Shanghai International Circuit, Jiading, Shanghai, designed by Hermann Tilke. When completed in 2004, it was the most expensive Formula One circuit facility, costing US$240 million. Abu Dhabi became the most expensive at US$6 billion when it opened in 2009. The track is 5.451 km long and features one of the trickiest corners combinations on the Formula One calendar, comparable to that of Istanbul Park's turn 8, also designed by Tilke. Turn 1 and 2 are a very demanding 270-degree, right-handed corner combination that requires considerable speed, in addition to a significant radius increase as the corner progresses.

History 
In the early 1990s, the Chinese government began to seek to host an F1 race. After Zhuhai International Circuit was opened in 1996 in the city of Zhuhai in Guangdong Province, southern China, a race there was provisionally added to the 1999 F1 World Championship calendar. But the track failed to meet FIA standard and the race was cancelled. 

In 2002, it was announced that the management of the Shanghai International Circuit, with assistance from the organizers of the Macau Grand Prix, had signed a seven-year contract with Formula One Management to host the Chinese Grand Prix from 2004 until 2011. The first Chinese Grand Prix, held on 26 September 2004, was won by Ferrari's Rubens Barrichello. The following year, it hosted the final round of the Formula One championship, in which the newly crowned world champion Fernando Alonso won and claimed the constructor's title for Renault. In 2006, the Chinese Grand Prix was won by Michael Schumacher, his last victory in Formula One.

In November 2008, the BBC reported that a senior race official, Qiu Weichang, had suggested that the money-losing race might be cancelled. Following a similar announcement about the French Grand Prix, Qiu said that the race's future was under consideration, and a decision would be made in 2009.

2010 came and went with no formal announcement of an extension to the initial seven-race deal struck in 2004. However, immediately after the 2010 Shanghai race Bernie Ecclestone, who manages the contracts with the various circuits, said of the 2011 calendar, "We are not dropping anything. [It's] 20 races – getting ready for 25".

It was only in February 2011 that a deal was agreed between F1 and the organisers of the Chinese round of the world championship. Reasons for the delay appear to have been over the fee paid to F1 to host the race. After racking up losses year after year, the organisers of the race refused to pay the fee required, reported to be amongst the highest paid to host an F1 race. F1 bosses appear to have reduced the fee and the new agreement to host an F1 race ran to 2017.

In September 2017, a new three-year contract to host the race was announced, keeping the race on the calendar until 2020. In 2019 it hosted the 1000th round of the Formula One World Championship.

COVID-19 pandemic and ongoing hiatus 
The 2020 Chinese Grand Prix was originally scheduled to take place on 19 April, but it was postponed and later cancelled due to the COVID-19 pandemic.

Winners of the Chinese Grand Prix

Repeat winners (drivers) 
Drivers in bold are competing in the Formula One championship in the current season.

Repeat winners (constructors) 
Teams in bold are competing in the Formula One championship in the current season.

Repeat winners (engine manufacturers) 
Manufacturers in bold are competing in the Formula One championship in the current season.

By year 
All Chinese Grands Prix have been held at Shanghai International Circuit.

Support races 
Formula BMW Asia and Porsche Carrera Cup Asia have both supported the Chinese Grand Prix since 2004. In 2008, the GP2 Asia Series also raced the same weekend. In 2015, the TCR International Series also supported the Chinese Grand Prix.

References

External links 

 
Formula One Grands Prix
National Grands Prix
Grand Prix
Recurring sporting events established in 2004
2004 establishments in China